Events from the year 1837 in Sweden

Incumbents
 Monarch – Charles XIV John

Events
 January - The Cause célèbre murder of Catharina Ulrika Hjort af Ornäs chock the country.
 - Kloka Anna i Vallåkra begin her career as a religious visionary.
 - The first issue of the Nya Wermlands-Tidningen
 - Albert Bonniers förlag is founded.
 - Stor-Stina starts her exhibition tours. 
 - Grannarne by Fredrika Bremer

Births
 19 May – Pontus Wikner, lecturer in philosophy and professor of aesthetics   (died 1888) 
 30 July – Signe Hebbe, opera singer  (died 1925) 
 Johanna Hedén, midwife  (died 1912)
 Maria Andersson (businesswoman) (died 1922)

Deaths
 3 January - Christina Rahm, opera singer and actress (born 1760) 
 11 January - Catharina Ulrika Hjort af Ornäs murder victim  (born 1767) 
 7 February -  Gustav IV Adolf of Sweden, deposed monarch  (born 1778) 
 20 May – Johan Afzelius, chemist  (born 1753) 
 24 May – Gustaf Lagerbielke, politician  (born 1817)
 21 August - Sophia Rosenhane, benefactor  (born 1757)
 - Inga Åberg, opera singer and stage actress (born 1773)

References

 
Years of the 19th century in Sweden
Sweden